Miroslav Hanuljak (born 12 September 1984) is a Czech professional ice hockey goaltender. He was selected by the Nashville Predators in the 7th round (213th overall) of the 2003 NHL Entry Draft.

Hanuljak previously played with HC Plzeň in the Czech Extraliga during the 2010–11 Czech Extraliga season, with Piráti Chomutov for two seasons from 2012 to 2014 and again during the 2015-16 season and with HC Litvínov in the 2018-19 season where he played two games.

References

External links

1984 births
Czech ice hockey goaltenders
Czech expatriate ice hockey players in Germany
EHC Freiburg players
HC Havířov players
Rytíři Kladno players
HC Litvínov players
Living people
HC Most players
Nashville Predators draft picks
HK Nitra players
Piráti Chomutov players
HC Plzeň players
Sportovní Klub Kadaň players
Czech expatriate ice hockey players in Slovakia
Sportspeople from Most (city)